Waskaganish Airport  is located near the town of Waskaganish, Quebec, Canada.

Airlines and destinations

References

External links

Eeyou Istchee (territory)
Certified airports in Nord-du-Québec